Eleanor Bishop may refer to:
 Eleanor Bishop (comics), a Marvel Comics character
 Eleanor Bishop (Marvel Cinematic Universe), the Marvel Cinematic Universe counterpart of the character
 Eleanor Bishop, a fictional character in the TV series NCIS
 Eleanor Zoe Bishop